Saulo Ismaro Haarla (21 November 1930, Helsinki – 4 October 1971) was a Finnish actor and theatre manager. He appeared in seven films between 1951–1961 and worked as a theatre manager in the Oulu City Theatre 1970–1971. Having been a heavy drinker, Haarla died in 1971 at the age of 40. His wife was the opera singer Helena Salonius, and they had two children, including the jazz musician Iro Haarla.

Filmography

Tukkijoella (1951)
Yö on pitkä (1952)
The Milkmaid (1953)
Rantasalmen sulttaani (1953)
Oi, muistatkos... (1954)
The Unknown Soldier (1955)
Pekka ja Pätkä sammakkomiehinä (1957)
Kaasua, komisario Palmu! (1961)

References

External links 
 

1930 births
1971 deaths
Male actors from Helsinki
Finnish male film actors
20th-century Finnish male actors